The Taedonggang Brewing Company (Taedonggang, Chosongul: 대동강 맥주) is a state-owned North Korean beer brewery company that brews the Taedonggang beer. The brewery is located in East Pyongyang and has facilities of tens of thousands of square meters.

History
In 2000, the North Korean Government decided to acquire a brewery. At that point having good relationships with the West, via connections to Germany the Government of North Korea bought the intact and still in place brewery plant of the closed Ushers of Trowbridge, Wiltshire, England for £1.5M via broker Uwe Oehms. Concerned it could be used for chemical weapons production, after assurances, Peter Ward, of brewing company Thomas Hardy Brewing and Packaging bought the plant, and arranged for a team from North Korea to travel to Trowbridge to dismantle it. Groundbreaking of the Taedonggang Beer Factory took place on 15 January 2000.  The brewery is located in the Sadong District of Pyongyang.

Taedonggang beer is named after the Taedong River, which runs through the center of Pyongyang.

On July 3, 2009, a commercial for the product was broadcast on state-run Korean Central Television in a rare move, as there are very few advertisements on North Korean television. It has been broadcast three times in all.

Products

The Taedonggang Brewing Company is mostly known outside the DPRK as the producer of the beer known as Taedonggang beer, which is the flagship beer of the companies. However the brewery also produces a brand of draught, a brand of black beer and a rice beer.

See also
 Beer in North Korea
 Korean cuisine

References

Works cited

External links
 Ratebeer: Taedonggang Brewery
  Pyongyang Report: Would you like a Taedonggang Beer?
  "Pyongyang Watch: Beer Leader" Asia Times article
  Television advertisement for Taedonggang beer archived at Ghostarchive.org on 29 April, 2022

Beer in North Korea
Food and drink companies of North Korea